Alan Warner (aka Allan Warner) (born 21 April 1947, Paddington in West London, England) is an English musician. As a boy he originally wanted to play  trumpet but ended up with a toy accordion. He started playing guitar at the age of 11, his parents bought him a cheap Spanish guitar for Christmas, and he soon realised, listening to the twangy tones of Duane Eddy, Hank Marvin, The Ventures, etc., that this was what he wanted to do.

Musical career
In the early 1960s, after leaving school at the age of fourteen, Warner played with several semi-professional groups playing local gigs, before becoming a professional musician two years later. Some of the groups he played in were The Leesiders Sect, The Line-up, Tel Thorne and The Dwellers and The Trekkers.

Warner nearly joined a group called The Black Eagles, which featured a bass player called Phil Lynott, who would later go on to find fame as the leader of Thin Lizzy.

In 1966, Warner joined The Ramong Sound and through the band's name change and evolution he was one of the founding members of The Foundations who would have hits with "Baby, Now That I've Found You", "Back On My Feet Again" and "Build Me Up Buttercup" and "In the Bad Bad Old Days (Before You Loved Me)". He played rhythm guitar and lead guitar as well as contributing to the song writing efforts of the group and backing both of the band's lead singers Clem Curtis and later Colin Young.

The Foundations broke around the end of 1970, Warner had gone on to form the progressive rock band, Pluto who would sign up to the Dawn Label, a subsidiary of PYE.

Later years
As well as being a musician / guitarist / guitar teacher, Warner is also an author of various guitar instruction books and instructional videos that include How To Play Rock Blues Guitar. The first book he wrote was called The Guitar Cook Book, the first of a succession of about 30 similar books and videos. He has also played on releases by Bob Mortimore and  The Bobby Graham band.

In the late 1980s, Warner teamed up with original Foundations lead singer Clem Curtis to re-cut the original Foundations hits.

In the late 1990s, due to the popularity of the hit film,  There's Something About Mary and the revived interest in the song, "Build Me Up Buttercup", Warner reformed a version of The Foundations that featured Colin Young, and another former Foundations member, Steve Bingham. After Colin Young left another singer Hue Montgomery was brought in to front the group. and they toured throughout the UK and down under in Australia.

Current
By January 2009, Warner was the lead singer and lead guitarist of a group called Flashback, and has also been booked at various venues with his other group Alan Warner's Foundations featuring singer Hue Montgomery.

References

External links

1947 births
Living people
People from Paddington
English rock guitarists
English male guitarists
English writers
The Foundations members